Solomon Lefschetz  (3 September 1884 – 5 October 1972) was an American mathematician who did fundamental work on algebraic topology, its applications to algebraic geometry, and the theory of non-linear ordinary differential equations.

Life
He was born in Moscow, the son of Alexander Lefschetz and his wife Sarah or Vera Lifschitz, Jewish traders who used to travel around Europe and the Middle East (they held Ottoman passports). Shortly thereafter, the family moved to Paris. He was educated there in engineering at the École Centrale Paris, but emigrated to the US in 1905.

He was badly injured in an industrial accident in 1907, losing both hands. He moved towards mathematics, receiving a Ph.D. in algebraic geometry from Clark University in Worcester, Massachusetts in 1911. He then took positions in University of Nebraska and University of Kansas, moving to Princeton University in 1924, where he was soon given a permanent position. He remained there until 1953.

In the application of topology to algebraic geometry, he followed the work of Charles Émile Picard, whom he had heard lecture in Paris at the École Centrale Paris. He proved theorems on the topology of hyperplane sections of algebraic varieties, which provide a basic inductive tool (these are now seen as allied to Morse theory, though a Lefschetz pencil of hyperplane sections is a more subtle system than a Morse function because hyperplanes intersect each other). The Picard–Lefschetz formula in the theory of vanishing cycles is a basic tool relating the degeneration of families of varieties with 'loss' of topology, to monodromy. He was an Invited Speaker of the ICM in 1920 in Strasbourg. His book L'analysis situs et la géométrie algébrique from 1924, though opaque foundationally given the current technical state of homology theory, was in the long term very influential (one could say that it was one of the sources for the eventual proof of the Weil conjectures, through SGA 7  also for the study of Picard groups of Zariski surface). In 1924 he was awarded the Bôcher Memorial Prize for his work in mathematical analysis.

The Lefschetz fixed-point theorem, now a basic result of topology, was developed by him in papers from 1923 to 1927, initially for manifolds. Later, with the rise of cohomology theory in the 1930s, he contributed to the intersection number approach (that is, in cohomological terms, the ring structure) via the cup product and duality on manifolds. His work on topology was summed up in his monograph Algebraic Topology (1942). From 1944 he worked on differential equations.

He was editor of the Annals of Mathematics from 1928 to 1958. During this time, the Annals became an increasingly well-known and respected journal, and Lefschetz played an important role in this.

In 1945 he travelled to Mexico for the first time, where he joined the Institute of Mathematics at the National University of Mexico as a visiting professor. He visited frequently for long periods, and during 1953–1966 he spent most of his winters in Mexico City. He played an important role in the foundation of mathematics in Mexico, and sent several students back to Princeton. His students included Emilio Lluis, José Adem, Samuel Gitler, Santiago López de Medrano, Francisco Javier González-Acuña and Alberto Verjovsky.

Lefschetz came out of retirement in 1958, because of the launch of Sputnik, to augment the mathematical component of Glenn L. Martin Company's Research Institute for Advanced Studies (RIAS) in Baltimore, Maryland. His team became the world's largest group of mathematicians devoted to research in nonlinear differential equations.  The RIAS mathematics group stimulated the growth of nonlinear differential equations through conferences and publications. He left RIAS in 1964 to form the Lefschetz Center for Dynamical Systems at Brown University, Providence, Rhode Island.

Selected works
 L´Analysis situs et la géométrie algébrique, Paris, Gauthier-Villars 1924
 Intersections and transformations of complexes and manifolds, Transactions of the American Mathematical Society vol. 28, 1926, pp. 1–49, online ; fixed-point theorem, published in vol. 29, 1927, pp. 429–462, online.
 Géométrie sur les surfaces et les variétés algébriques, Paris, Gauthier Villars 1929
 Topology, AMS 1930
 Algebraic Topology, New York, American Mathematical Society 1942
 Introduction to topology, Princeton 1949
 with Joseph P. LaSalle, Stability by Liapunov's direct method with applications, New York, Academic Press 1961
 Algebraic geometry, Princeton 1953, 2nd edn., 1964
 Differential equations: geometric theory, Interscience, 1957, 2nd edn., 1963
 Stability of nonlinear control systems, 1965
 Reminiscences of a mathematical immigrant in the United States, American Mathematical Monthly, vol.77, 1970, pp. 344–350.

References

External links

 
 
 "Fine Hall in its golden age: Remembrances of Princeton in the early fifties" by Gian-Carlo Rota. Contains a lengthy section on Lefschetz at Princeton.
 Gompf: What is a Lefschetz Pencil?, Notices AMS 2005
 National Academy of Sciences Biographical Memoir

1884 births
1972 deaths
Topologists
École Centrale Paris alumni
Jewish American scientists
Russian Jews
Emigrants from the Russian Empire to the United States
20th-century American mathematicians
Princeton University faculty
Clark University alumni
National Medal of Science laureates
Foreign Members of the Royal Society
University of Kansas faculty
Presidents of the American Mathematical Society
Brown University faculty